C'mon, C'mon is the fourth studio album by American singer-songwriter Sheryl Crow, released on April 8, 2002, in the United Kingdom and April 16, 2002 in the United States. Lead single "Soak Up the Sun" peaked at No. 1 on the Billboard Adult Contemporary chart and No. 17 on the Billboard Hot 100, becoming one of her biggest hits since "All I Wanna Do". The album was arguably her most pop-influenced to date, a big departure from the folk and rock sound on her previous release, The Globe Sessions.

C'mon, C'mon debuted at No. 2 on the UK Albums Chart and on the US Billboard 200, with first-week sales of 185,000 copies in the United States. The album has been certified Platinum in the US and Japan, selling 2.1 million units in the US as of January 2008. The song "Safe and Sound" is dedicated to Crow's former boyfriend Owen Wilson and is an account of their relationship.

Track listing

Music videos 
"Steve McQueen"
"Soak Up the Sun"
"Safe and Sound" (live)

Personnel

Sheryl Crow – organ, acoustic guitar, bass guitar, piano, accordion, electric guitar, keyboards, Hammond organ, vocals, chorus, Fender Rhodes, Wurlitzer, Moog bass, tambo drums, Moroccan drum
Jeff Anthony – drums, drum programming 
Charlie Bisharat – violin
Doyle Bramhall II – guitar, electric guitar, background vocals
Matthew Brubeck – cello, string arrangements 
Lenny Castro – percussion, congas, shaker
Keith Ciancia – organ, keyboards, string samples
Joe Deninzon – violin
Joel Derouin – violin, concert master
Mike Elizondo – bass guitar
Davey Faragher – upright bass
Mitchell Froom – string arrangements 
Matt Funes – viola
Berj Garabedian – violin
David Gold – viola
Douglas Grean – electric guitar, keyboards
Joyce Hammann – violin
Emmylou Harris – vocals on "Weather Channel"
Don Henley – vocals on "It's So Easy"
Jill Jaffe – violin
Brad Jones – bass
Steve Jordan – drums, tambo drums, Moroccan drum
Suzie Katayama – cello, concert master
Julia Kent – cello
Michelle Kinney – cello
Lenny Kravitz – vocals on "You're an Original"
Ron Lawrence – viola
Brian MacLeod – drum fills
Natalie Maines – vocals on "Abilene"
Wendy Melvoin – electric guitar
Stevie Nicks – vocals on "C'mon, C'mon" and "Diamond Road"
Gwyneth Paltrow – vocals on "It's Only Love"
Paul Peabody – violin
Shawn Pelton – drums, bells, drum loops
Liz Phair – vocals on "Soak Up the Sun"
Matthew Pierce – violin
Lorenza Ponce – violin, string arrangements 
Michele Richards – violin
Craig Ross – guitar, electric guitar, rhythm guitar
Jane Scarpantoni – cello, contractor
John Shanks – bass guitar, electric guitar, drum loops, percussion programming 
Keith Schreiner – drum programming 
Debra Shufelt – viola
Antoine Silverman – violin, concert master
Daniel Smith – cello
Tim Smith – acoustic guitar, bass guitar, electric guitar, background vocals
Jeremy Stacey – percussion, drums, toy piano, synthesizer strings, Moog lead, drum loops, string arrangements 
Rudy Stein – cello
Peter Stroud – acoustic guitar, guitar, electric guitar, background vocals, slide guitar, Wurlitzer, acoustic 12 string guitar, drum loops
Shari Sutcliffe – contractor
Marti Sweet – violin
Hiroko Taguchi – violin
Benmont Tench – organ, piano, Hammond organ
Jeff Trott – acoustic guitar, bass guitar, electric guitar, lap steel guitar, drum programming 
Soozie Tyrell – violin
Joan Wasser – violin
Evan Wilson – viola
Garo Yellin – cello

Production
Producers: Sheryl Crow except tracks 2 and 3 produced by Sheryl Crow & Jeff Trott and track 1 by Sheryl Crow & John Shanks
Executive Producer: Scooter Weintraub
Engineers: Dean Baskerville, Monique Mizrahi, Thom Panunzio, Ross Petersen, Chris Reynolds, John Saylor, Brian Scheuble, Christopher Shaw, Trina Shoemaker, Keith Shortreed, Peter Stroud, Eric Tew, Mark Valentine
Mixing: Jack Joseph Puig (tracks 1,3,4,6), Steve Sisco (mixing assistant), Andy Wallace (tracks 2,5,7,8,9,10,11,12,13,14,15), Joe Zook (mixing assistant)
Mastering: Howie Weinberg
Sampling: John Shanks
Digital editing: Roger Lian
Production coordination: Chris Hudson, Pam Wertheimer
Art direction: Jeri Heiden
Design: Jeri Heiden, Glen Nakasako
Photography: Sheryl Nields

Charts and certifications

Weekly charts

Year-end charts

Certifications

Accolades
Grammys

|-
|  style="width:35px; text-align:center;" rowspan="4"|2003 || C'mon, C'mon || Best Rock Album, Grammy Award for Best Engineered Album, Non-Classical || 
|-
|"Steve McQueen" || Best Female Rock Vocal Performance || 
|-
| "Soak Up the Sun" || Best Female Pop Vocal Performance || 
|-
| "It's So Easy" (Duet with Don Henley) || Best Pop Collaboration with Vocals || 
|-

American Music Awards

|-
|  style="width:35px; text-align:center;"|2003 || Sheryl Crow (performer) || Favorite Pop/Rock Female Artist|| 
|-

References

2002 albums
Sheryl Crow albums
Albums produced by John Shanks
A&M Records albums
Albums recorded at Henson Recording Studios